Vaskrääma is a village in Pärnu municipality, Pärnu County in southwestern Estonia.

Before the 2017 Administrative reform, the village belonged to Paikuse Parish.

Estonia composer, organist and choir conductor Mihkel Lüdig (1880–1958), was born in Vaskrääma.

Until 2008, Pärnu–Mõisaküla railway passed through the territory of the village, where the Vaskrääma railway station used to be.

References

Villages in Pärnu County
Pärnu